Șieu (or Shif) is a commune in Maramureș County, Maramureș, Romania. It is composed of a single village, Șieu.

Natives 
 Nicolae Dunca

References

External links 

Communes in Maramureș County
Localities in Romanian Maramureș